The Last Hammer Blow is a 2014 French drama film directed by Alix Delaporte. It was selected to compete for the Golden Lion at the 71st Venice International Film Festival where Romain Paul won the Marcello Mastroianni Award for Best New Young Actor.

Cast
 Romain Paul as Victor
 Clotilde Hesme as Nadia
 Grégory Gadebois as Samuel
 Candela Peña as Maria 
 Tristán Ulloa as Fabio 
 Farid Bendali as Omar  
 Mireia Vilapuig as Luna  
 Víctor Sánchez as Miguel

Accolades

References

External links
 

2014 films
2014 drama films
French drama films
2010s French-language films
Films directed by Alix Delaporte
2010s French films